Veronica panormitana is a species of plants in the family Plantaginaceae.

Sources

References 

panormitana
Flora of Malta